Adam Creighton may refer to:
 Adam Creighton (ice hockey)
 Adam Creighton (journalist)